The 1987 British Grand Prix (formally the XL Shell Oils British Grand Prix) was a Formula One motor race held on 12 July 1987 at the Silverstone Circuit, Silverstone. It was the seventh race of the 1987 Formula One World Championship. It was the 42nd British Grand Prix and the 23rd to be held at Silverstone.

The race was won by local driver Nigel Mansell, driving a Williams-Honda. In one of his most memorable Formula One performances, Mansell hunted down Brazilian team-mate Nelson Piquet, who had started from pole position, with three laps remaining. It was Mansell's third win of the season, and his second consecutive British Grand Prix victory. Ayrton Senna finished third in his Lotus-Honda, one lap behind.

The win moved Mansell into second place in the Drivers' Championship, level on points with Piquet and one point behind Senna.

Qualifying report
As usual, Honda-powered cars dominated the qualifying sessions, with Nelson Piquet taking pole position and Ayrton Senna third in his Lotus despite being a full second slower than Mansell. Alain Prost was fourth in his McLaren, while the Benettons of Thierry Boutsen and Teo Fabi were fifth and sixth, and the Ferraris of Michele Alboreto and Gerhard Berger seventh and eighth. Completing the top ten were Andrea de Cesaris in the Brabham and Stefan Johansson in the second McLaren.

During qualifying, Piercarlo Ghinzani's Ligier ran out of fuel in front of the pits. His mechanics jumped the pit wall, refuelled him on the track and then push-started him, a clear violation of the rules leading to Ghinzani's exclusion from the remainder of the event. Before the incident, the Italian had set a time which would have put him 19th on the grid.

Qualifying classification

Race report
At the start, Prost was the quickest and took the lead, only to be passed by Piquet at Maggotts; Mansell soon followed his teammate. The race then developed into a battle between the two Williams drivers, with Piquet leading most of the time.

On lap 35, Mansell was around two seconds behind his teammate. Both Williams drivers were scheduled to complete the race without a tyre change, but Mansell and the team elected to make a stop to change tyres. Mansell rejoined the race some 29 seconds behind Piquet, with 28 laps remaining. On fresh rubber, Mansell began an epic charge, breaking the lap record eight times to the delight of the over 100,000 strong British crowd.

By lap 62 Mansell was right on Piquet's tail, and on lap 63 the Englishman overtook his teammate. Shortly after crossing the finish line, Mansell's car slowed down and was engulfed by the crowd. Initially it was thought that he had run out of fuel, but he had actually blown up the engine, out of the stress of running the last 6 laps on "Q" mode (which gives the engine +100hp), and risking running out of fuel at any moment (his fuel display was reading "minus 2.5 laps"). In fact that incident was the last straw for the patience of the Honda management, since it had – again – threatened their easily attainable 1-2 result. Honda would switch their supply of engines from Williams to McLaren for 1988, while Piquet would sign for Lotus – also running Hondas – in the following weeks. Senna finished third, one lap down, with a further lap back to teammate Satoru Nakajima in fourth. Derek Warwick was fifth in the Arrows-Megatron, with Fabi completing the top six.

Race classification
Numbers in brackets refer to positions of normally aspirated entrants competing for the Jim Clark Trophy.

 * Piercarlo Ghinzani was excluded from the race due to refuelling his car on the track during qualifying.

Championship standings after the race

Drivers' Championship standings

Constructors' Championship standings

Jim Clark Trophy standings

Colin Chapman Trophy standings

References

British Grand Prix
British Grand Prix
Grand Prix
British Grand Prix